Stenus zunicus is a species of rove beetle described by Thomas Lincoln Casey Jr. in 1884. This species can locomote on top of water.

References

Steninae
Beetles described in 1884
Taxa named by Thomas Lincoln Casey Jr.